Kaspars Znotiņš (born 7 October 1975) is a Latvian stage and film actor.

Born in Jelgava, Latvia, Znotiņš began his career working on the New Riga Theatre, and has performed in stage productions at the  Latvian National Theatre and Daile Theatre. Znotiņš has also appeared in a number of Latvian films, such as the 2010 Gatis Šmits-directed comedy-drama Return of Sergeant Lapins. In 2010, he won the Season Award (Latvian: Spēlmaņu nakts), an annual award bestowed upon to the best Latvian dramatic stage actor by the Latvian Theatre Union (LTDS) for his role in Ziedonis un visums (Ziedonis and the Universe). In 2017, he won the Lielais Kristaps Award for Best Actor for his role as Francis in the  Aik Karapetian directed crime-drama film Pirmdzimtais (English: Forstborn).
 
Znotiņš is married and the father of four children – Emīls, Rūta, Krišs and Zīle.

Filmography

References

External links
 
 Jaunais Rīgas Teātris

1975 births
Living people
People from Jelgava
Latvian male film actors
Latvian male stage actors
Lielais Kristaps Award winners
20th-century Latvian male actors
21st-century Latvian male actors
Latvian Academy of Culture alumni